WPNH may refer to:

WPNH (AM), a radio station (1300 AM) licensed to Plymouth, New Hampshire, United States
WPNH-FM, a radio station (100.1 FM) licensed to Plymouth, New Hampshire, United States